Ronaldo Ramos Caiado (born September 25, 1949) is a Brazilian politician. An orthopedic physician trained at the School of Medicine and Surgery of Rio de Janeiro, he comes from a family landowners and politicians from Goiás. He is the grandson of Antonio Ramos Caiado. Caiado served as chairman of the União Democrática Ruralista in the late eighties (1986-1989), an organization that aims to defend the interests of landowners.

In politics 
Caiado ran for president with the PSD, at 1989 Brazilian presidential election, obtaining 0.68% of the votes.

He was elected federal deputy for Goiás in 1990. The following year he joined PFL - now renamed DEM, to which he is still affiliated. He ran for governor of Goiás in 1994, obtaining 3rd place with 23.18% of the votes.

Caido was re-elected federal deputy successively in 1998, 2002, 2006 and 2010. In 2014 he was elected Senator and from February 1, 2015 to January 1, 2019 has been the DEM bench leader in the Senate.

In the October 2018 elections Ronaldo Caiado ran for governor in the state of Goiás, next to his vice-candidate Lincoln Tejota. Reaching 1.773.185 votes (59,73% of the valid votes), he was elected in the first round, beating Daniel Vilela, from the Brazilian Democratic Movement (MDB), with 479.180 votes (16,14% of the valid votes).

A right wing politician, in his speeches Ronaldo Caiado often criticizes the current PT government. In 2014 he was elected senator for the state of Goiás with 1,283,665 votes.

Controversies

Statements of Demostenes Torres 
On 31 March 2015 the former senator from DEM, Demóstenes Torres, published an article in Goiás' newspaper Folha da Manhã, claiming that Ronaldo Caiado had expenses of the 2002 campaigns, 2006 and 2010 financed by Carlinhos Cachoeira scheme. Caiado denied the allegations, stating that Demostenes "has a typical behavior of a psychopath"  and that the former senator was trying to get back at Caiado, as the latter had supported the impeachment process against Torres in 2012.

References

External links 
 Dados do Deputado - Câmara dos Deputados
 Sítio pessoal do Deputado
 Canal pessoal no Youtube
 Twitter do Deputado Caiado
 Canal pessoal no Flickr
 Ronaldo Caiado no Portal 730
 Ronaldo Caiado no Estadão
 Ronaldo Caiado no programa Roda Viva

Candidates for President of Brazil
Brazil Union politicians
Conservatism in Brazil
Governors of Goiás
Members of the Federal Senate (Brazil)
Members of the Chamber of Deputies (Brazil) from Goiás
1949 births
Living people
People from Anápolis
Brazilian orthopaedic surgeons